Lieutenant-General Francis Tiburtius Dias, PVSM, AVSM, VrC (14 October 1934 – 16 January 2019) was an Indian Army officer, who was involved in the  Indo-Pakistani War of 1971.

Early days
Dias was born in 1934 into a Goan family having Portuguese ancestry. He is the elder brother of Cardinal Ivan Dias.

Military career
Francis T. Dias joined the Gorkha Regiment in 1954 as a second lieutenant.

Vir Chakra
The citation for the Vir Chakra awarded to him reads:

Lieutenant Colonel Francis Tiburtius Dias was commanding a battalion of 11th Gorkha Rifles during the operations against Pakistan in the Eastern Sector. On 12 December 1971, he was ordered to capture a well prepared position held by an enemy infantry battalion. Again, on 13 December, the battalion was assigned the task of capturing two bridges held by the enemy in strength. And finally on 14 December 1971 the battalion was assigned the task of capturing a portion of Bogra Town. Under his leadership, the battalion carried out all the tasks successfully, inflicting heavy casualties on the enemy. After contacting the enemy defences at Mahasthana, he infiltrated between the enemy's forward defended localities, raided the enemy battalion headquarters, and captured the officer commanding along with other officers. He also thwarted enemy efforts to blow up bridges. It was due to him that the battalion contributed to a great extent in clearing Bogra Town and taking a large number of prisoners.

Throughout this operation, Lieutenant Colonel Dias displayed gallantry, professional skill and leadership of a high order.

References

1934 births
2019 deaths
People from Pune
Indian generals
Recipients of the Vir Chakra